Dauwendaele is a part of the city of Middelburg, The Netherlands.
It's a suburb of mostly houses with low to middle-class families. There is good access to schools, with three elementary schools on a fairly small area.

See also
The Netherlands
Zeeland

References
 Crimes per 1000 inhabitants per county in The Netherlands 
 List of elementary schools

Populated places in Zeeland
Middelburg, Zeeland